White Limousine is the fifth album by American singer-songwriter Duncan Sheik. It was released on Zoë Records in 2006.

Details
The album was more political in nature, particularly in the singles "White Limousine" and "Shopping". The album came with a DVD-ROM which included software allowing the listener to remix tracks from the album.  An outgrowth of the effort has been a dedicated website for fans to upload remixes of various songs. While there were at least a dozen fan remixes featured, the website was subsequently deactivated.

Track listing
All songs written by Duncan Sheik
"Hey Casanova" – 5:12
"The Dawn's Request" – 4:25
"White Limousine" – 4:38
"I Don't Believe in Ghosts" – 3:47
"Nothing Fades" – 4:54
"Fantastic Toys & Corduroys" – 5:07
"Shopping" – 4:55
"Star-Field on Red Lines" – 3:44
"I Wouldn't Mind" – 3:30
"Land" – 5:27
"So Gone" – 3:35
"Hymn" – 6:04

Personnel
 Duncan Sheik - piano, electric guitar, 12 string guitar, acoustic guitar, tambourine, Fender Rhodes, hammered dulcimer, drum loops, synthesizers, Wurlitzer, accordion
 Gerry Leonard - electric guitar, drum loops
 Jeff Allen - bass
 Doug Yowell - drums, percussion
 Jay Bellerose - percussion
 David Poe, Fil Kronengold - background vocals
Technical
 Kevin Killen - recording, mixing
 Bob Ludwig - mastering
 Jeremy Cowart - photography
 Steven Jurgensmeyer, Sarit Melmed - design

References 

2006 albums
Duncan Sheik albums
Zoë Records albums